The Trap Rock River is a  tributary of Torch Lake that flows through Keweenaw and Houghton counties in the Upper Peninsula of Michigan in the United States.

See also
List of rivers of Michigan

References

Michigan  Streamflow Data from the USGS

Rivers of Michigan
Rivers of Keweenaw County, Michigan
Rivers of Houghton County, Michigan